The Porter Block is an historic building in Victoria, British Columbia, Canada.  Built in 1900, it is located at the northwest corner of Douglas and Johnson Streets.

See also
 List of historic places in Victoria, British Columbia

References

External links
 

1900 establishments in Canada
Buildings and structures completed in 1900
Buildings and structures in Victoria, British Columbia